Lenperone (Elanone-V) is a typical antipsychotic of the butyrophenone chemical class. It was first reported as an anti-emetic in 1974, and its use in treatment of acute schizophrenia was reported in 1975. Related early antipsychotic agents include declenperone and milenperone.

Lenperone was never approved by the FDA for use in humans in the United States, but prior to 1989 it was approved for use in veterinary medicine for sedation.

Synthesis

The alkylation between 2-(3-chloropropyl)-2-(4-fluorophenyl)-1,3-dioxolane [3308-94-9] (1) and 4-(4-fluorobenzoyl)piperidine [56346-57-7] (2) gives 2-(p-fluorophenyl)-2-{3-[4-(p-fluorobenzoyl)piperidino]propyl}-1,3-dioxolane, CID:20318874 (3). Deprotection of the ketal function completes the synthesis of lenperone (4).

See also 
 Glemanserin
 Pruvanserin
 Roluperidone
 Volinanserin

Chemically related drugs containing the same 4-(p-fluorobenzoyl)piperidine group:
 Altanserin 
 Ketanserin
 Setoperone
 Lidanserin

References 

Butyrophenone antipsychotics
Fluoroarenes
Piperidines
Typical antipsychotics
Veterinary drugs